Pelocoris carolinensis is a species of creeping water bug in the family Naucoridae. It is found in the southeastern United States.

References

Insects described in 1907
Naucoridae